Hiring may refer to:

 Recruitment of personnel (usually called hiring in American English)
 Renting of something (borrowing for a fee, usually called hiring in British English)
 Recruitment Agency; A specialist company that is used when 'Hiring Talent' or employees for a business. Example- "Reesby Recruitment"
 To source talent, (usually used in Australian English)